Dasychira manto, the Manto tussock moth, is a species of tussock moth in the family Erebidae. It was first described by Herman Strecker in 1900 and it is found in North America.

The MONA or Hodges number for Dasychira manto is 8307.

Subspecies
There are two subspecies:
 Dasychira manto interposita Dyar, 1911 c g
 Dasychira manto manto g
Data sources: i = ITIS, c = Catalogue of Life, g = GBIF, b = BugGuide

References

Further reading

External links

 

Lymantriinae
Articles created by Qbugbot
Moths described in 1900